American record producer Jermaine Dupri has released several music videos, working with various directors. He has also been featured in several music videos, making cameo appearances for other prominent recording artists. Dupri also presented the Lifetime talent show, The Rap Game making it his television production.

1993
 "It's a Shame" (Kris Kross)
 "Alright" (Kris Kross)
 "I'm Real" (Kris Kross)
 "Just Kickin' It" (Xscape)

1994
 "Funkdafied" (Da Brat)
 "Give It To You" (Da Brat)

1996
 "Live and Die for Hip Hop" (Kris Kross featuring Da Brat, Aaliyah, Jermaine Dupri & Mr. Black)
 "Touch Myself (Remix)" (T-Boz Ft. Richie Rich)
 "Ghetto Love" (Da Brat Ft. T-Boz)

1997
 "You Make Me Wanna" (Usher)
 "In My Bed So So Def Remix"  (Dru Hill features Jermaine Dupri & Da Brat) 
 "My Way" (Usher)
 "The Way That You Talk" (Jagged Edge featuring Da Brat)

1998
 "With Me" (Destiny's Child featuring Jermaine Dupri)
 "Money Ain't a Thang" (Jermaine Dupri featuring Jay-Z)
 "Sweetheart" (Jermaine Dupri featuring Mariah Carey)
 "The Party Continues" (Jermaine Dupri featuring Da Brat & Usher)

1999
 "Da Ballers" (Master P featuring Jermaine Dupri)

2000
 "Get None" (Tamar Braxton featuring Jermaine Dupri & Amil)
 "Jumpin' Jumpin' (So So Def Remix) (Destiny's Child featuring Bow Wow, Jermaine Dupri & Da Brat)
 "I've Got to Have It" (Jermaine Dupri featuring Nas & Monica)
 "Let's Get Married" (Jagged Edge)(only in voice)
 "Bounce with Me" (Bow Wow featuring Xscape)
 "Let's Get Married (So So Def Remix)" (Jagged Edge featuring Rev Run of Run-D.M.C.)
 "Bow Wow (That's My Name)" (Bow Wow featuring Snoop Dogg)

2001
 "Puppy Love" (Bow Wow featuring Jagged Edge)
 "Where the Party At" (Jagged Edge featuring Nelly)
 "Ghetto Girls" (Bow Wow)
 "Where the Party At (So So Def Remix)" (Jagged Edge featuring Jermaine Dupri, Da Brat, Bow Wow R.O.C & Tigah)
 "Thank You" (Bow Wow featuring Fundisha & Jagged Edge)
 "What's Going On" (Jermaine Dupri featuring Bono, Britney Spears, Christina Aguilera, Jennifer Lopez, Jagged Edge, Gwen Stefani, Mary J. Blige, Backstreet Boys, Destiny's Child, Diddy, Lil' Kim, Fred Durst of Limp Bizkit, Eve, Monica, Nelly Furtado, Nona Gaye, Darren Hayes, Ja Rule, Alicia Keys, Aaron Lewis of Staind, Nas, Nelly, *NSYNC, Michael Stipe of R.E.M., Usher, Wyclef Jean)
 "Someone To Call My Lover (So So Def Remix)" (Janet Jackson featuring Jermaine Dupri)
 "Welcome to Atlanta" (Jermaine Dupri featuring Ludacris)

2002
 ""Ballin' out of Control" (Jermaine Dupri featuring Nate Dogg) 
 "I Got It 2" (Jagged Edge featuring Nas)
 "Welcome to Atlanta (coast to coast remix)" (Jermaine Dupri featuring Diddy, Murphy Lee & Snoop Dogg)
 "Take Ya Home" (Bow Wow)
 "Basketball (Bow Wow featuring Fundisha, Fabolous & Jermaine Dupri)

2003
 "Miss P." (Cherish featuring Da Brat & Jermaine Dupri)
 "Right Thurr (remix)" (Chingy featuring Trina & Jermaine Dupri)
 "Pop That Booty" (Marques Houston featuring Jermaine Dupri)
 "Wat Da Hook Gon Be" (Murphy Lee featuring Jermaine Dupri)
 "Let's Get Down" (Bow Wow featuring Birdman)

2004
 "What's It Like"(So So Def Remix) (Jagged Edge featuring Jermaine Dupri)
 "Take Ya Clothes Off" (Ying Yang Twins featuring Bone Crusher)
 "Tipsy" (J-Kwon)
 "Hood hop" (J-Kwon)

2005
 "Introduction" (SunN.Y. featuring Jermaine Dupri & Lex Dirty)
 "What It Iz" (Young Capone featuring Nitty)
 "Let Me Hold You" (Bow Wow featuring Omarion)
 "I'm Hot" (Young Capone featuring Daz Dillinger & T-Roc)
 "Oh, I Think They Like Me" (Dem Franchize Boyz featuring Da Brat, Jermaine Dupri & Bow Wow)
 "Baby Mama Love" (N2Ufeaturing Jermaine Dupri)
 "Gotta Getcha" (Jermaine Dupri featuring Johnta Austin)
 "Fresh Azimiz (Bow Wow featuring J-Kwon & Jermaine Dupri) (only in voice background)
 "Fresh Azimiz (Remix) (Bow Wow featuring Mike Jones, J-Kwon & Jermaine Dupri) (only in voice background)
 "Ridin' Rims" (Dem Franchize Boyz)
 "Lean wit It, Rock wit It" (Dem Franchize Boyz)
 "Grillz" (Nelly featuring Paul Wall, Ali & Gipp, & Brandi Williams of Blaque)

2006
 "So Amazing" (Jagged Edge)
 "So Amazing" (So So Def Remix) (Jagged Edge featuring Voltio)
 "Pullin' Me Back"  (Chingy featuring Tyrese) 
 "Dem Jeans" (Chingy featuring Jermaine Dupri)
 "Turn It Up (Johnta Austin featuring Jermaine Dupri)
 "Stunnas" (Jagged Edge featuring Jermaine Dupri)
 "Feelin You" (3LW featuring Jermaine Dupri)
 "Shortie Like Mine" (Bow Wow featuring Chris Brown)
 "On Some Real Shit" (Daz Dillinger featuring Rick Ross) 
 "Call on Me"  (Janet Jackson featuring Nelly) (only in voice background)
 "Better Start Talking" (Donell Jones featuring Jermaine Dupri)
 "Everytime tha Beat Drop" (Monica featuring Dem Franchize Boys)
 "Hard N Da Paint" (Ali & Gipp featuring Nelly)

2007
 "I'm Throwed (Paul Wall featuring Jermaine Dupri)
 "Almost Made Ya" (Ali & Gipp featuring LeToya) (only in voice background)
 "Put A Little Umph In It/Whole Town Laughing" (Jagged Edge)
 "Lil' L.O.V.E. (Bone Thugs-n-Harmony featuring Mariah Carey & Bow Wow)
 "Baby Don't Go (Fabolous featuring T-Pain & Jermaine Dupri)
 "5000 Ones (DJ Drama featuring Nelly, T.I., Yung Joc, Willie the Kid, Young Jeezy, Diddy & Twista)

2008
 "Umma Do Me" (Rocko)
 "Get Buck in Here" (DJ Felli Fel featuring Diddy, Akon, Ludacris, & Lil Jon)
 "And Me Up" (9th Ward featuring Nitti & Jermaine Dupri) 
 "I Luv Your Girl" (The-Dream featuring Young Jeezy)
 "Streetz On Lock" (Hot Dollar) (only in voice background) 
 "Stepped On My J'z" (Nelly featuring Jermaine Dupri & Ciara)
 "Good Good" (Ashanti) (only in voice background)
 "On A Mission" (Q featuring Jermaine Dupri)
 "Everybody Hates Chris" (Ludacris)

2009
 "Roc The Mic" (Bow Wow featuring Jermaine Dupri)
 "You Can Get It All" (Bow Wow featuring Jermaine Dupri) (only in voice background)
 "So Much Swag" (Ocean’s Seven featuring Bow Wow)
 "Vegas Baby" (Ocean’s Seven)
 "Can't Stop Partying" with Weezer and Lil Wayne

Dupri, Jermaine